Thomas Modesley was a sixteenth-century English  priest.

Modesley was presented dean of Chester by Queen Elizabeth on 12 August 1580 and served until his death in 1589.

Notes

1589 deaths
16th-century English people
Deans of Chester